Swalecliffe is a part of the ribbon development of the north Kent coast between Whitstable and Herne Bay in Southeast England. It forms Swalecliffe ward of City of Canterbury Council.

History
The Doomsday book provides an early record of Swalecliffe: 
There is no mention of a church, but when the old church was demolished in 1875 there were traces of an earlier building.  This may have been an early phase of the Norman church, but Whitley says that "it seems highly probable that the original church was a Saxon Foundation".  Sketches of the old church appear to show Norman windows along with later features.

Throughout the later middle ages there are records of gifts to the church for a variety of purposes.  There is little other information about the village.  The church records do however record periods of frost, floods and gales to which a sea-facing, low-lying land would be subject.  In the winters of 1812 and 1813 the sea froze in the Thames Estuary.

Swalecliffe's only mention in Hasted's monumental history of Kent records the gift in 1581 of a farm called "Bodkin's" (worth £11 6s 8d) to Gonvyle and Caius college in Cambridge University.  Most of the money (£10 13s 4d) was used to fund four scholars.

The description in the National Gazetteer of 1868 reads:

Transport
The Ramsgate branch of the Chatham Main Line runs south of Swalecliffe which is served by Chestfield & Swalecliffe railway station.

The A2990 Thanet Way runs between Swalecliffe and the neighbouring settlement of Chestfield and provides access to the main transport network.

There used to be an aerodrome at Swalecliffe, but its location is unknown. There is a report of a "Flying Circus" visiting the aerodrome in 1935.

Recreational facilities
The ponds, stream and sea are all centres for birdwatching.  In 2016 158 species of birds were recorded by members of Kent Ornithological Society.

To the north of the village the links provide a recreational resource and include a skateboard park.  Part of the Saxon Shore Way footpath runs along the coast here.

Healthcare provision
Swalecliffe Community Day Service provides support for people with learning disabilities both at Swalecliffe Day Centre and by organising outings to other facilities in the area.

Gallery

Notes

References

Bibliography

 (no ISBN)

External links

The Beacon Church
Swalecliffe Baptist Church
St John's Church, Swalecliffe (Anglican)

Villages in Kent
Populated coastal places in Kent
Whitstable